A Butterfly in the Night is a 1977 Argentine comedy-drama film directed by and starring Armando Bo alongside Isabel Sarli.

Cast

Isabel Sarli as Yvonne
Armando Bo as Jorge
Víctor Bó as Lorenzo
Vicente Rubino as Vicente
Juan José Miguez as Pedro
Horacio Bruno as the pirate
Claude Marting as policeman
Mario Casado as Cholo
Adelco Lanza as Manolo
Carlos Lagrotta as Escrilano
Enrique Vargas 			
Nino Udine 	 		
Pancho Jiménez 			
Arturo Noal 		
Juan Carlos Cevallos

References

External links

 

1977 films
1970s Spanish-language films
1977 comedy-drama films
Films directed by Armando Bó
Films about prostitution in Argentina
1977 comedy films
1977 drama films
Argentine comedy-drama films
1970s Argentine films